Gertrude Courtenay, Marchioness of Exeter, (née Blount ; c.1499/1502 – 25 September 1558) was an English Marchioness, married to Henry Courtenay, 1st Marquess of Exeter and a member of the court of Henry VIII of England. She was a godmother to the future Elizabeth I.

Life
Gertrude was the daughter of William Blount, 4th Baron Mountjoy, Katherine of Aragon's chamberlain, and his first wife Elisabeth Saye; she may have had a sister, Mary, who married Henry Bourchier, 2nd Earl of Essex and died in 1555.  One of her step-mothers was Inez de Venegas, one of Catherine of Aragon's original Spanish ladies-in-waiting. She married in 1519. Her spouse Henry Courtenay was a close friend (and first cousin) of Henry VIII's, having "been brought up of a child with his grace in his chamber."

She was one of Queen Catherine of Aragon's attendants at the Field of the Cloth of Gold in 1520.

In 1533, Anne Boleyn gave birth to a baby girl. Princess Elizabeth was baptised, and Gertrude, a close friend of Katherine of Aragon's, was chosen as the godmother at the confirmation, which was performed immediately after the baptism. Apparently, it was well known that Gertrude "really wanted to have nothing to do with this" but agreed "so as not to displease the King". As this was such a public spectacle—and as a godparent was expected to provide an extremely expensive present—historian Eric Ives has concluded that the decision to appoint Gertrude to this role was malicious.

In October 1537, Gertrude represented Princess Mary at the pre-funeral ceremonies for Queen Jane Seymour at Hampton Court Palace.

Gertrude was imprisoned with her husband, Henry Courtenay, and their son, Edward, in the Tower of London following the discovery of the supposed Exeter Conspiracy in 1538. Widowed when Henry was executed, Gertrude and her son were attainted and remained in prison. In 1540, she was released from the Tower.

A personal friend of queen Mary I of England, Gertrude attended court during her reign.

References

 Cooper, J. P. D. "Courtenay, Gertrude, marchioness of Exeter (d. 1558)." Oxford Dictionary of National Biography. Oxford University Press 2004. Online Edition January 2008

English marchionesses
Daughters of barons
16th-century English women
Gertrude
Gertrude
1558 deaths
Year of birth uncertain
Prisoners in the Tower of London